The 1990 Texas A&M Aggies football team completed the season with a 9–3–1 record.  The Aggies had a regular season Southwest Conference record of 5–2–1. The team was ranked #15 in the final AP Poll and #13 in the final Coaches Poll.

Schedule

Roster
T Brusinski
J Gonzales
M Kilmer
D Lewis
K McAfee
D Patterson
L Pavalas
B Payne
K Petty
F Ransby
QB Bucky Richardson
G Salazar
G Schorp
R Simmons
S Wood

Game summaries

Hawaii

Southwestern Louisiana

North Texas

Louisiana State

Texas Tech

at Houston

Baylor

Rice

Southern Methodist

Arkansas

Texas Christian

Texas

Brigham Young

References

Texas AandM
Texas A&M Aggies football seasons
Holiday Bowl champion seasons
Texas AandM Aggies football